Selma Björnsdóttir (born 13 June 1974), also known as simply Selma or Selma Björns, is an Icelandic actress and singer born in Reykjavík, best known internationally for representing Iceland in the Eurovision Song Contest in both 1999 and 2005.

Career

Áfram Latibær
In 1996, she played 'Solla Stirða' in the Icelandic stage play Áfram Latibær!. This character later developed into Stephanie in the children's television show LazyTown. She would later choreograph episodes of LazyTown.

Eurovision 
Her first Eurovision experience occurred in 1999 contest in Jerusalem, with the song All Out of Luck. The song was the pre-contest favourite with bookmakers. During the voting, Selma shot into an early lead in the voting, but was gradually pegged back by Sweden, represented by Charlotte Nilsson. Despite trailing Nilsson only very narrowly before the penultimate set of votes were announced, Selma's hopes of victory came to an abrupt end when Bosnia and Herzegovina awarded maximum points to Sweden and nothing at all to Iceland. Selma's second place in Jerusalem was Iceland's best showing in the contest until 2009, when singer Jóhanna, also from Iceland, placed second in the contest.

In 2005, Selma was again selected to represent Iceland in the Eurovision Song Contest in Kyiv. However, despite being one of the favourites to win the contest, her song If I Had Your Love did not make it to the final. This was Iceland's worst result in the contest at the time. [when?] 

Selma also was one of the main attractions at the Eurovision gala concert during Europride 2005 in Oslo, performing both of her Eurovision entries. Other celebrities included Baccara, Nanne, Bobbysocks and Nora Brockstedt. Later the same night she held an intimate concert at the popular nearby nightclub Smuget, where another Icelandic Eurovision participant, Paul Oscar and the Norwegian Eurovision commentator, Jostein Pedersen, showed up.

Other work 
Selma has dubbed several Disney princesses for the Icelandic Language, including: Belle, Tiana, Kayley, Tzipporah, Odette, Giselle, and Megara. In 2009, Selma became a jury member on Idol Stjörnuleit, the Icelandic version of Pop Idol.

See also
 Iceland in the Eurovision Song Contest
 Europride

References

External links

 Iceland's Eurovision website
 Clip of "All Out Of Luck" from Eurovision 1999
 The video of "If I had Your Love" (requires Windows Media Player & broadband)

1974 births
Living people
Eurovision Song Contest entrants of 1999
Eurovision Song Contest entrants of 2005
Selma Bjornsdottir
Selma Bjornsdottir
Selma Bjornsdottir
Selma Bjornsdottir
Selma Bjornsdottir
Selma Bjornsdottir
Selma Bjornsdottir
Selma Bjornsdottir
21st-century Icelandic women singers
Selma Bjornsdottir
Selma Bjornsdottir